Timmaraja Wodeyar II (? – 1572), was the sixth maharaja of the Kingdom of Mysore, who ruled between 7 February 1553 and 1572. He was eldest son of Chamaraja Wodeyar III, the fifth raja of Mysore. On 17 February 1553, he succeeded on the death of his father. Thimmaraja Wodeyar II was the first 'maharaja' to rule as absolute monarch and denounce Mysore Kingdom's vassalage to the Vijayanagara Empire.

Declaration of independence from Vijayanagara 
Right in his father's days, Thimmaraja Wodeyar II had learnt the lineage of the royal families in Vijayanagara. Both his father and his brother, including himself, had begun to question the legitimacy of the Tuluva family. Before his father could take a stand against feudalism, he died. However, right after coming to power in 1553, he formally declared independence of the Kingdom of Mysore from the Vijayanagara Empire. In Vijayanagara, though, Rama Raya was in power, trying to hold together the falling pieces of the empire. But, disintegration and insubordination were faster than Rama Raya's consolidation of power. In this political mood, the Bahamani sultans and the Mughal emperors began further invasion of fiefdoms. Thimmaraja Wodeyar II took this opportunity and declared independence, although it wasn't until his brother's time that this came into full swing.

He died in 1572 and was succeeded by his brother Chamaraja Wodeyar IV.

See also
Rama Raya
Chamaraja Wodeyar IV
Wodeyar dynasty

1572 deaths
Kings of Mysore
Timmaraja II
Year of birth unknown
16th-century Indian monarchs